Alex Þór Hauksson (born 26 November 1999) is an Icelandic football player. He plays for Swedish club Öster.

International
He made his debut for the Iceland national football team on 15 January 2019 in a friendly against Estonia, as a 69th-minute substitute for Aron Elís Þrándarson.

References

External links
 
 

1999 births
Living people
Alex Þór Hauksson
Alex Þór Hauksson
Alex Þór Hauksson
Alex Þór Hauksson
Association football midfielders
Alex Þór Hauksson
Östers IF players
Alex Þór Hauksson
Superettan players
Alex Þór Hauksson
Expatriate footballers in Sweden
Alex Þór Hauksson